The South Two River is a  tributary of the Two River of Minnesota, United States. It is part of the Mississippi River watershed.

The South Two River rises east of Albany at the outlet of Schwinghamer Lake and flows northeast past Holdingford. Near Bowlus it joins the North Two River to form the Two River, which continues  to the Mississippi.

See also
List of rivers of Minnesota

References

Minnesota Watersheds
USGS Geographic Names Information Service
USGS Hydrologic Unit Map - State of Minnesota (1974)

Rivers of Minnesota
Tributaries of the Mississippi River
Rivers of Stearns County, Minnesota
Rivers of Morrison County, Minnesota